Leonie Frieda (born 1956) a former model, translator, and writer, working and living in the United Kingdom.

She is the daughter of Swedish aristocrats.

Educated in the UK, France and Germany, Frieda speaks five languages. Her first book was a biography of Catherine de' Medici. Published in 2003, it became a bestseller. Frieda has also made documentaries for TV.

She lives in London with her two children by her former husband, music producer Nigel Frieda.

Works
Catherine de Medici: Renaissance Queen of France (Weidenfeld & Nicolson, 2003)
Deadly Sisterhood: A Story of Women, Power, and Intrigue in the Italian Renaissance, 1427-1527 (Weidenfeld & Nicolson, 2012)
Francis I: The Maker of Modern France (Weidenfeld & Nicolson, 2018)

References

External links
 

1956 births
Living people
English biographers
Swedish women writers
Women biographers